NGC 7012 is a large, bright elliptical galaxy located about 380 million light-years away from Earth in the constellation Microscopium. NGC 7012 was discovered by astronomer John Herschel on July 1, 1834.

Abell S0921
NGC 7012 is the brightest member in the center of a small compact group of interacting galaxies known as Abell S0921. Due to it also being the dominant member of the group, NGC 7012 is classified as a Cd galaxy. The group has about seven major galaxies with many other more distant, fainter galaxies that are probably also associated.

See also
 Elliptical galaxy
 List of NGC objects (7001–7840)
 List of galaxy groups and clusters

References

External links

Astronomical objects discovered in 1834
Microscopium
7012
Elliptical galaxies
66116